Jade Allen is an Australian cricketer who plays as a right-arm leg break bowler and right-handed batter for New South Wales Breakers in the Women's National Cricket League (WNCL) and Sydney Sixers in the Women's Big Bash League (WBBL). She made her professional debut during the 2021–22 WBBL for the Sixers against Melbourne Stars, but did not bat or bowl.

International career
In December 2022, Allen was selected in the Australia Under-19 squad for the 2023 ICC Under-19 Women's T20 World Cup.

References

External links

Living people
Place of birth missing (living people)
Australian women cricketers
New South Wales Breakers cricketers
Sydney Sixers (WBBL) cricketers
Year of birth missing (living people)